Tiago Roberto Stragliotto (born August 16, 1984 in Ijuí), known as Tiago Gaúcho, is a Brazilian footballer who currently plays for Pelotas.

References

External links

1984 births
Association football midfielders
Brazilian expatriate footballers
Brazilian expatriate sportspeople in Indonesia
Brazilian footballers
Expatriate footballers in Indonesia
Liga 1 (Indonesia) players
Living people
Sportspeople from Rio Grande do Sul
Bonsucesso Futebol Clube players
Ceará Sporting Club players
Pelita Bandung Raya players
Vila Nova Futebol Clube players
Sociedade Esportiva do Gama players
América Futebol Clube (SP) players
Ipatinga Futebol Clube players
Agremiação Sportiva Arapiraquense players
Esporte Clube Pelotas players